Julie Victoria Jones (born 1963) is a British author of fantasy.

She was born 1963 in Liverpool, England, as the daughter of a pub owner. In her youth she worked as a bar tender and for a record label in Liverpool. She lives in San Diego, California, where she initially ran an export business and later occupied a position as marketing director.  The current publishers of J. V. Jones are Tor books in the US and Orbit Books in the UK.

The manuscript that was to become the first novel in the Book of Words trilogy was submitted as Immortal Longings to Warner Books in 1993. In a joint essay, The Road to a First Novel, J. V. Jones and Betsy Mitchell describe the editing process that followed the arrival of the manuscript in the publisher's slush pile. The novel was published in 1995 as The Baker's Boy. The Book of Words trilogy was completed in 1997 and followed by a standalone novel, The Barbed Coil, in the same year. Her Sword of Shadows series was launched in 1999 and is to contain five books.

Bibliography

The Book of Words 
 The Baker's Boy (1995)
 A Man Betrayed (1996)
 Master and Fool (1997)

A Sword of Shadows
 A Cavern of Black Ice (1999)
 A Fortress of Grey Ice (2002)
 A Sword from Red Ice (2007)
  Watcher of the Dead (2010)
  Endlords (forthcoming, tentative title)

Other books
 The Barbed Coil (1997)

References

External links
The J.V. Jones Website
 Interview at SFFWorld.com
 Novel synopses, cover art, and reviews at Fantasy Literature.net

English fantasy writers
Living people
Novelists from Liverpool
1963 births
English women novelists